Old New Orleans may refer to:

 The old parts of New Orleans, Louisiana
 USS YFD-2, a yard floating dock nicknamed Old New Orleans
 Old New Orleans a 1940 short documentary movie with James A. FitzPatrick

See also
 Old New Orleans Rum, a rum producer in Louisiana
 List of songs about New Orleans, including songs with "Old New Orleans" in their titles